The EarthScope project was an National Science Foundation (NSF) funded earth science program that, from 2003-2018, used geological and geophysical techniques to explore the structure and evolution of the North American continent and to understand the processes controlling earthquakes and volcanoes. The project had three components: USArray, the Plate Boundary Observatory, and the San Andreas Fault Observatory at Depth. Organizations associated with the project included UNAVCO, the Incorporated Research Institutions for Seismology (IRIS), Stanford University, the United States Geological Survey (USGS) and National Aeronautics and Space Administration (NASA). Several international organizations also contributed to the initiative. EarthScope data are publicly accessible.

Observatories 
There were three EarthScope observatories: the San Andreas Fault Observatory at Depth (SAFOD), the Plate Boundary Observatory (PBO), and the Seismic and Magnetotelluric Observatory (USArray). These observatories consist of boreholes into an active fault zone, global positioning system (GPS) receivers, tiltmeters, long-baseline laser strainmeters, borehole strainmeters, permanent and portable seismographs, and magnetotelluric stations. The various EarthScope components will provide integrated and highly accessible data on geochronology and thermochronology, petrology and geochemistry, structure and tectonics, surficial processes and geomorphology, geodynamic modeling, rock physics, and hydrogeology.

Seismic and Magnetotelluric Observatory (USArray) 

USArray, managed by IRIS, is a 15-year program to place a dense network of permanent and portable seismographs across the continental United States. These seismographs record the seismic waves released by earthquakes that occur around the world. Seismic waves are indicators of energy disbursement within the earth. By analyzing the records of earthquakes obtained from this dense grid of seismometers, scientists can learn about Earth structure and dynamics and the physical processes controlling earthquakes and volcanoes. The goal of USArray is primarily to gain a better understanding of the structure and evolution of the continental crust, lithosphere, and mantle underneath North America.

The USArray is composed of four facilities: a Transportable Array, a Flexible Array, a Reference Network, and a Magnetotelluric Facility.

The Transportable Array is composed of 400 seismometers that are being deployed in a rolling grid across the United States over a period of 10 years. The stations are placed 70 km apart, and can map the upper 70 km of the Earth. After approximately two years, stations are moved east to the next site on the grid – unless adopted by an organization and made a permanent installation. Once the sweep across the United States is completed, over 2000 locations will have been occupied. The Array Network Facility is responsible for data collection from the Transportable Array stations.

The Flexible Array is composed of 291 broadband stations, 120 short period stations, and 1700 active source stations. The Flexible Array allows sites to be targeted in a more focused manner than the broad Transportable Array. Natural or artificially created seismic waves can be used to map structures in the Earth.

The Reference Network is composed of permanent seismic stations spaced about 300 km apart. The Reference Network provides a baseline for the Transportable Array and Flexible Array. EarthScope added and upgraded 39 stations to the already existing Advanced National Seismic System, which is part of the Reference Network.

The Magnetotelluric Facility is composed of seven permanent and 20 portable sensors that record electromagnetic fields. It is the electromagnetic equivalent of the seismic arrays. The portable sensors are moved in a rolling grid similar to the Transportable Array grid, but are only in place about a month before they are moved to the next location. A magnetotelluric station consists of a magnetometer, four electrodes, and a data recording unit that are buried in shallow holes. The electrodes are oriented north-south and east-west and are saturated in a salt solution to improve conductivity with the ground.

Plate Boundary Observatory (PBO) 

The Plate Boundary Observatory PBO consists of a series of geodetic instruments, Global Positioning System (GPS) receivers and borehole strainmeters, that have been installed to help understand the boundary between the North American Plate and Pacific Plate. The PBO network includes several major observatory components: a network of 1100 permanent, continuously operating Global Positioning System (GPS) stations many of which provide data at high-rate and in real-time, 78 borehole seismometers, 74 borehole strainmeters, 26 shallow borehole tiltmeters, and six long baseline laser strainmeters. These instruments are complemented by InSAR (interferometric synthetic aperture radar) and LiDAR (light detection and ranging) imagery and geochronology acquired as part of the GeoEarthScope initiative. PBO also includes comprehensive data products, data management and education and outreach efforts. These permanent networks are supplemented by a pool of portable GPS receivers that can be deployed for temporary networks to researchers, to measure the crustal motion at a specific target or in response to a geologic event. The Plate Boundary Observatory portion of EarthScope is operated by UNAVCO, Inc. UNAVCO is a non-profit, university-governed consortium that facilitates research and education using geodesy.

San Andreas Fault Observatory at Depth (SAFOD) 

The San Andreas Fault Observatory at Depth (SAFOD) consists of a main borehole that cuts across the active San Andreas Fault at a depth of approximately 3 km and a pilot hole about 2 km southwest of San Andreas Fault. Data from the instruments installed in the holes, which consist of geophone sensors, data acquisition systems, and GPS clocks, as well as samples collected during drilling, will help to better understand the processes that control the behavior of the San Andreas Fault.

Data Products 
Data collected from the various observatories are used to create different types of data products. Each data product addresses a different scientific problem.

P-Wave Tomography 
Tomography is a method of producing a three-dimensional image of the internal structures of a solid object (such as the human body or the earth) by the observation and recording of differences in the effects on the passage of energy waves impinging on those structures. The waves of energy are P-waves generated by earthquakes and are recording the wave velocities. The high quality data that is being collected by the permanent seismic stations of USArray and the Advanced National Seismic System (ANSS) will allow the creation of high resolution seismic imaging of the Earth's interior below the United States. Seismic tomography helps constrain mantle velocity structure and aids in the understanding of chemical and geodynamic processes that are at work. With the use of the data collected by USArray and global travel-time data, a global tomography model of P-wave velocity heterogeneity in the mantle can be created. The range and resolution of this technique will allow investigation into the suite of problems that are of concern in the North American mantle lithosphere, including the nature of the major tectonic features. This method gives evidence for differences in thickness and the velocity anomaly of the mantle lithosphere between the stable center of the continent and the more active western North America. This data is vital for the understanding of local lithosphere evolution, and when combined with additional global data, will allow the mantle to be imaged beyond the current extent of USArray.

Receiver Reference Models 
EarthScope Automated Receiver Survey (EARS), has created a prototype of a system that will be used to address several key elements of the production of EarthScope products. One of the prototype systems is the receiver reference model. It will provide crustal thickness and average crustal Vp/Vs ratios beneath USArray transportable array stations.

Ambient Seismic Noise 
The main function of the Advanced National Seismic System (ANSS) and USArray, is to provide high quality data for earthquake monitoring, source studies and Earth structure research. The utility of seismic data is greatly increased when noise levels, unwanted vibrations, are reduced; however broadband seismograms will always contain a certain level of noise. The dominant sources of noise are either from the instrumentation itself or from ambient Earth vibrations. Normally, seismometer self noise will be well below the seismic noise level, and every station will have a characteristic noise pattern that can be calculated or observed. Sources of seismic noise within the Earth are caused by any of the following: the actions of human beings at or near the surface of the Earth, objects moved by wind with the movement being transferred to the ground, running water (river flow), surf, volcanic activity, or long period tilt due to thermal instabilities from poor station design.

A new approach to seismic noise studies will be introduced with the EarthScope project, in that there are no attempts to screen the continuous waveforms to eliminate body and surface waves from the naturally occurring earthquakes. Earthquake signals are not generally included in the processing of noise data, because they are generally low probability occurrences, even at low power levels. The two objectives behind the collection of the seismic noise data are to provide and document a standard method to calculate ambient seismic background noise, and to characterize the variation of ambient background seismic noise levels across the United States as a function of geography, season, and time of day. The new statistical approach will provide the ability to compute probability density functions (PDFs) to evaluate the full range of noise at a given seismic station, allowing the estimation of noise levels over a broad range of frequencies from 0.01–16 Hz (100-0.0625s period). With the use of this new method it will be much easier to compare seismic noise characteristics between different networks in different regions.

Earthquake Ground Motion Animations 
Seismometers of USArray transportable array record the passage of numerous seismic waves through a given point near the Earth's surface, and classically these seismograms are analyzed to deduce properties of the Earth's structure and the seismic source. Given a spatially dense set of seismic recordings, these signals can also be used to visualize the actual continuous seismic waves, providing new insights and interpretation techniques into complex wave propagation effects. Using signals recorded by the array of seismometers, the EarthScope project will be able to animate seismic waves as they sweep across the USArray transportable array for selected larger earthquakes. This will be able to illustrate the regional and teleseismic wave propagation phenomena. The seismic data collected from both permanent and transportable seismic stations will be used to provide these computer generated animations.

Regional Moment Tensors 
The seismic moment tensor is one of the fundamental parameters of earthquakes that can be determined from seismic observations. It is directly related to earthquake fault orientation and rupture direction. The moment magnitude, Mw derived from the moment tensor magnitude, is the most reliable quantity for comparing and measuring the size of an earthquake with other earthquake magnitudes. Moment tensors are used in a wide range of seismological research fields, such as earthquake statistics, earthquake scaling relationships, and stress inversion. The creation of regional moment tensor solutions, with the appropriate software, for moderate-to-large earthquakes in the U.S. will be from USArray transportable array and Advance National Seismic System broadband seismic stations. Results are obtained in the time and the frequency domain. Waveform fit and amplitude-phase match figures are provided to allow users to evaluate moment tensor quality.

Geodetic Monitoring of the Western US and Hawaii 
Global Positioning System (GPS) equipment and techniques provide a unique opportunity for earth scientists to study regional and local tectonic plate motions and conduct natural hazards monitoring. Cleaned network solutions from several GPS arrays have merged into regional clusters in conjunction with the EarthScope project. The arrays include the Pacific Northwest Geodetic Array, EarthScope's Plate Boundary Observatory, the Western Canadian Deformation Array, and networks run by the US Geological Survey. The daily GPS measurements from ~1500 stations along the Pacific/North American plate boundary provide millimeter-scale accuracy and can be used monitor the displacements of the earths crust. With the use of data modeling software and the recorded GPS data, the opportunity to quantify crustal deformation caused by plate tectonics, earthquakes, landslides and volcanic eruptions will be possible.

Time-dependent Strain 
The goal is to provide models of time-dependent strain associated with a number of recent earthquakes and other geologic events as constrained by GPS data. With the use of InSAR (Interferometric Synthetic Aperture Radar), a remote-sensing technique, and PBO (Plate Boundary Observatory), a fixed array of GPS receivers and strainmeters, the EarthScope project will provide spatially continuous strain measurements over wide geographic areas with decimeter to centimeter resolution.

Global Strain Rate Map 
The Global Strain Rate Map (GSRM) is a project of the International Lithosphere Program whose mission is to determine a globally self-consistent strain rate and velocity field model, consistent with geodetic and geologic field observations collected by GPS, seismometers, and strainometers. GSRM is a digital model of the global velocity gradient tensor field associated with the accommodation of present-day crustal motions. The overall mission also includes: (1) contributions of global, regional, and local models by individual researchers; (2) archive existing data sets of geologic, geodetic, and seismic information that can contribute toward a greater understanding of strain phenomena; and (3) archive existing methods for modeling strain rates and strain transients. A completed global strain rate map will provide a large amount of information which will contribute to the understanding of continental dynamics and for the quantification of seismic hazards.

Science 
There are seven topics that EarthScope will address with the use of the observatories.

Convergent Margin Processes 

Convergent margins, also known as convergent boundaries, are active regions of deformation between two or more tectonic plates colliding with one another. Convergent margins create areas of tectonic uplift, such as mountain ranges or volcanoes. EarthScope is focusing on the boundary between the Pacific Plate and the North American Plate in the western United States. EarthScope will provide GPS geodetic data, seismic images, detailed seismicity, magnetotelluric data, InSAR, stress field maps, digital elevation models, baseline geology, and paleoseismology for a better understanding of convergent margin processes.

A few questions hoping to be answered by EarthScope include:
 What controls the lithospheric architecture?
 What controls the locus of volcanism?
 How do convergent margin processes contribute to growth of the continent through time?

Crustal Strain and Deformation 
Crustal strain and deformation is the change in shape and volume of continental and oceanic crust caused by stress applied to rock through tectonic forces. An array of variables including composition, temperature, pressure, etc., determines how the crust will deform.

A few questions hoping to be answered by EarthScope include:
 How do crust and mantle rheology vary with rock type and with depth?
 How does lithospheric rheology change in the vicinity of a fault zone?
 What is the distribution of stress in the lithosphere?

Continental Deformation 
Continental deformation is driven by plate interactions through active tectonic processes such as continental transform systems with extensional, strike-slip, and contractional regimes. EarthScope will provide velocity field data, portable and continuous GPS data, fault-zone drilling and sampling, reflection seismology, modern seismicity, pre-Holocene seismicity, and magnetotelluric and potential field data for a better understanding of continental deformation.

A few questions hoping to be answered by EarthScope include:
 What are the fundamental controls on deformation of the continent?
 What is the strength profile(s) of the lithosphere?
 What defines tectonic regimes within the continent?

Continent Structure and Evolution 
Earth's continents are compositionally distinct from the oceanic crust. The continents record four billion years of geologic history, while the oceanic crust gets recycled about every 180 million years. Because of the age of continental crusts, the ancient structural evolution of the continents can be studied. Data from EarthScope will be used to find the mean seismic structure of the continental crust, associated mantle, and crust-mantle transition. Variability in that structure will also be studied. EarthScope will attempt to define continental lithosphere formation and continent structure and to identify the relationship between continental structure and deformation.

A few questions hoping to be answered by EarthScope include:
 How does magmatism modify, enlarge, and deform continental lithosphere?
 How are the crust and lithospheric mantle related?
 What is the role of extension, orogenic collapse, and rifting in constructing the continents?

Faults and Earthquake Processes 
EarthScope is acquiring 3D and 4D data that will give scientists a more detailed insight into faulting and earthquakes than ever before. This project is providing a much needed data upgrade from work done in previous years thanks to many technological advances. New data will enable an improved study and understanding of faults and earthquakes that will increase our knowledge of the complete earthquake process, allowing for the continued development of building predictive models. Detailed information on internal fault zone architecture, crust and upper mantle structure, strain rates, and transitions between fault systems and deformation types; as well as heat flow, electromagnetic/magnetotelluric, and seismic waveform data, will all be made available.

A few questions hoping to be answered by EarthScope include:
 How does strain accumulate and release at plate boundaries and within the North American plate?
 How do earthquakes start, rupture, and stop?
 What is the absolute strength of faults and the surrounding lithosphere?

Deep Earth Structure 
Through the use of seismology, scientists will be able to collect and evaluate data from the deepest parts of our planet, from the continental lithosphere down to the core. The relationship between lithospheric and the upper mantle processes is something that is not completely known, including upper mantle processes below the United States and their effects on the continental lithosphere. There are many issues of interest, such as determining the source of forces originating in the upper mantle and their effects on the continental lithosphere. Seismic data will also give scientists more understanding and insight into the lower mantle and the Earth's core, as well as activity at the core-mantle boundary.

A few questions hoping to be answered by EarthScope include:
 How is evolution of the continents linked to processes in the upper mantle?
 What is the level of heterogeneity in the mid-mantle?
 What is the nature and heterogeneity of the lower mantle and core-mantle boundary?

Fluids and Magmas 
EarthScope hopes to provide a better understanding of the physics of fluids and magmas in active volcanic systems in relation to the deep Earth and how the evolution of continental lithosphere is related to upper mantle processes. The basic idea of how the various melts are formed is known, but not the volumes and rates of magma production outside of Mid-ocean ridge basalts. EarthScope will provide seismic data and tomographic images of the mantle to better understand these processes.

A few questions hoping to be answered by EarthScope include:
 Over what temporal and spatial scales do earthquake deformation and volcanic eruptions couple?
 What controls eruption style?
 What are the predictive signs of imminent volcanic eruption? What are the structural, rheological, and chemical controls on fluid flow in the crust?

Education and Outreach 
The Education and Outreach Program is designed to integrate EarthScope into both the classroom and the community. The program must reach out to scientific educators and students as well as industry professionals (engineers, land/resource managers, technical application/data users), partners of the project (UNAVCO, IRIS, USGS, NASA, etc.), and the general public. To accomplish this, the EOP offers a wide array of educational workshops and seminars, directed at various audiences, to offer support on data interpretation and implementation of data products into the classroom. Their job is to make sure that everyone understands what EarthScope is, what it is doing in the community, and how to use the data it is producing. By generating new research opportunities for students in the scientific community, the program also hopes to expand recruitment for future generations of earth scientists.

Mission 
"To use EarthScope data, products, and results to create a measurable and lasting change on the way that Earth science is taught and perceived in the United States."

Goals 
 Create a high-profile public identity for EarthScope that emphasizes the integrated nature of the scientific discoveries and the importance of EarthScope research initiatives.
 Establish a sense of ownership among scientific, professional, and educational communities and the public so that a diverse group of individuals and organizations can and will make contributions to EarthScope.
 Promote science literacy and understanding of EarthScope among all audiences through informal education venues.
 Advance formal Earth science education by promoting inquiry-based classroom investigations that focus on understanding Earth and the interdisciplinary nature of EarthScope.
 Encourage use of EarthScope data, discoveries, and new technology in resolving challenging problems and improving our quality of life.

EarthScope In the Classroom 
Education and outreach will be developing tools for educators and students across the United States to interpret and apply this information for solving a wide range of scientific issues within the earth sciences. The project tailors its products to the specified needs and requests of educators.

K-12 Education 
One tool that has already been put into action is the EarthScope Education and Outreach Bulletin. The bulletin, targeted for grades 5-8, summarizes a volcanic or tectonic event documented by EarthScope and puts it into an easily interpretable format, complete with diagrams and 3D models. They follow specific content standards based on what a child should be learning at those grade levels. Another is the EarthScope Voyager, Jr. which allows students to explore and visualize the various types of data that are being collected. In this interactive map, the user can add various types of base maps, features, and plate velocities. Educators have access to real time GPS data of plate movement and influences through the UNAVCO website.

University Level 
EarthScope promises to produce a large amount of geological and geophysical data that will open the door for numerous research opportunities in the scientific community. As the USArray Big Foot project moves across the country, universities are adopting seismic stations near their areas. These stations are then monitored and maintained by not only the professors, but their students as well. Scouting for future seismic station locations has created field work opportunities for students. The influx of data has already begun creating projects for undergraduate research, master's thesis, and doctoral dissertations. A list of currently funded proposals can be found on the NSF website.

Legacy 

Many applications for EarthScope data currently exist, as mentioned above, and many more will arise as more data becomes available. The EarthScope program is dedicated to determining the three dimensional structure of the North American continent. Future uses of the data that it produces might include hydrocarbon exploration, aquifer boundary establishment, remote sensing technique development, and earthquake risk assessment. Due to the open and free-to-the-public data portals that EarthScope and its partners maintain, the applications are limited only by the creativity of those who wish to sort through the gigabytes of data. Also, because of its scale, the program will undoubtedly be the topic of casual conversation for many people outside of the geologic community. EarthScope chatter will be made by people in political, educational, social, and scientific arenas.

Geologic Legacy 
The multidisciplinary character of EarthScope will create stronger network connections between geologists of all types and from around the country. Building an Earth model of this scale requires a complex community effort, and this model is likely to be the first EarthScope legacy. Researchers analyzing the data will leave us with a greater scientific understanding of geologic resources in the Great Basin and of the evolution of the plate boundary on the North American west coast. Another geologic legacy desired by the initiative, is to invigorate the Earth sciences community. Invigoration is self-perpetuating as evidenced by participation from thousands of organizations from around the world and from all levels of students and researchers. This leads to a significantly heightened awareness within the general public, including the next cohort of prospective Earth scientists. With further evolution of the EarthScope project, there may even be opportunities to create new observatories with greater capabilities, including extending the USArray over the Gulf of Mexico and the Gulf of California. There is much promise for EarthScope tools and observatories, even after retirement, to be used by universities and professional geologists. These tools include the physical equipment, software invented to analyze the data, and other data and educational products initiated or inspired by EarthScope.

Political Legacy 
The science produced by EarthScope and the researchers using its data products will guide lawmakers in environmental policy, hazard identification, and ultimately, federal funding of more large-scale projects like this one. Besides the three physical dimensions of North America's structure, a fourth dimension of the continent is being described through geochronology using EarthScope data. Improving understanding of the continent's geologic history will allow future generations to more efficiently manage and utilize geologic resources and live with geologic hazards. Environmental policy laws have been the subject of some controversy since the European settlement of North America. Specifically, water and mineral rights issues have been the focus of dispute. Representatives in Washington D.C. and the state capitals require guidance from authoritative science in drafting the soundest environmental laws for our country. The EarthScope research community is in a position to provide the most reliable course for government to take concerning environmental policy.

Hazard identification with EarthScope is an application already in use. In fact, the Federal Emergency Management Agency (FEMA) has awarded the Arizona Geological Survey and its partner universities funding to adopt and maintain eight Transportable Array stations. The stations will be used to update Arizona's earthquake risk assessment.

Social Legacy 
For EarthScope to live up to its potential in the Earth sciences, the connections between the research and the education and outreach communities must continue to be cultivated. Enhanced public outreach to museums, the National Park System, and public schools will ensure that these forward-thinking connections are fostered. National media collaboration with high-profile outlets such as Discovery Channel, Science Channel, and National Geographic may secure a lasting legacy within the social consciousness of the world. Earth science has already been promoted as a vital modern discipline, especially in today's “green” culture, to which EarthScope is contributing. The size of the EarthScope project augments the growing public awareness of the broad structure of the planet on which we live.

See also 
 EarthScope Consortium
 German Continental Deep Drilling Programme (KTB)
 Kola Superdeep Borehole
 San Andreas Fault Observatory at Depth (SAFOD project)

References

External links 
 Historic EarthScope program website archive
 EarthScope Consortium
 Incorporated Research Institutions for Seismology (IRIS)
 University NAVSTAR Consortium (UNAVCO)
 National Science Foundation (NSF)
 United States Geological Survey (USGS)

Seismological observatories, organisations and projects
Geophysics
Geodesy
Seismology
Regional geology
Satellite navigation
Global Positioning System